The James A. Cayce Administration Service Building is a building located in Nashville, Tennessee. It was listed on the National Register of Historic Places listings in Davidson County, Tennessee in 2019.

History
Architecture firm Marr and Holman designed the Classical Revival structure and it was completed in 1943. The building was home to the Nashville Housing Authority. In 1972 Nashville Housing Authority was later renamed the Metropolitan Development and Housing Agency (MDHA).

The building was added to the National Register of Historic Places listings in Davidson County, Tennessee (NRHP) on December 19, 2019. The building was added to the NRHP for two reasons: its historic role in Nashville’s public housing, and the architectural design of the structure.

References

1943 establishments in Tennessee
National Register of Historic Places in Nashville, Tennessee
Buildings and structures in Nashville, Tennessee
Commercial buildings on the National Register of Historic Places in Tennessee
Commercial buildings completed in 1943